Emil Skamene,  (born 27 August 1941) is a Canadian Immunologist and medical researcher.

He is the Director of Research for the McGill University Health Centre, the Director of the Centre for the Study of Host Resistance, and a Professor in the Department of Medicine, the Department of Human Genetics, and the Institute of Parasitology.

In 2005, he was made a Knight (Chevalier) of the National Order of Quebec. In 2001, he was awarded the Prix Armand-Frappier. In 1997, he was made a Fellow of the Royal Society of Canada.

External links
 McGill University faculty page
 National Order of Quebec citation 
 Prix Armand-Frappier citation 

1941 births
Living people
Canadian medical researchers
Fellows of the Royal Society of Canada
Canadian immunologists
Academic staff of McGill University
Knights of the National Order of Quebec